ECL (Enterprise Control Language) is a declarative, data-centric programming language designed in 2000 to allow a team of programmers to process big data across a high performance computing cluster without the programmer being involved in many of the lower level, imperative decisions.

History 
ECL was initially designed and developed in 2000 by David Bayliss as an in-house productivity tool within Seisint Inc and was considered to be a ‘secret weapon’ that allowed Seisint to gain market share in its data business. Equifax had an SQL-based process for predicting who would go bankrupt in the next 30 days, but it took 26 days to run the data. The first ECL implementation solved the same problem in 6 minutes. The technology was cited as a driving force behind the acquisition of Seisint by LexisNexis and then again as a major source of synergies when LexisNexis acquired ChoicePoint Inc.

Language constructs 
ECL, at least in its purest form, is a declarative, data-centric language. Programs, in the strictest sense, do not exist. Rather an ECL application will specify a number of core datasets (or data values) and then the operations which are to be performed on those values.

Hello world 
ECL is to have succinct solutions to problems and sensible defaults. The "Hello World" program is characteristically short:
 'Hello World'
Perhaps a more flavorful example would take a list of strings, sort them into order, and then return that as a result instead.

// First declare a dataset with one column containing a list of strings
// Datasets can also be binary, CSV, XML or externally defined structures

D := DATASET([{'ECL'},{'Declarative'},{'Data'},{'Centric'},{'Programming'},{'Language'}],{STRING Value;});
SD := SORT(D,Value);
output(SD)

The statements containing a := are defined in ECL as attribute definitions. They do not denote an action; rather a definition of a term. Thus, logically, an ECL program can be read: "bottom to top"

 OUTPUT(SD)

What is an SD?
 SD := SORT(D,Value); 
SD is a D that has been sorted by ‘Value’

What is a D?
 D := DATASET([{'ECL'},{'Declarative'},{'Data'},{'Centric'},{'Programming'},{'Language'}],{STRING Value;});
D is a dataset with one column labeled ‘Value’ and containing the following list of data.

ECL primitives 
ECL primitives that act upon datasets include SORT, ROLLUP, DEDUP, ITERATE, PROJECT, JOIN, NORMALIZE, DENORMALIZE, PARSE, CHOSEN, ENTH, TOPN, DISTRIBUTE

ECL encapsulation 
Whilst ECL is terse and LexisNexis claims that 1 line of ECL is roughly equivalent to 120 lines of C++, it still has significant support for large scale programming including data encapsulation and code re-use. The constructs available include MODULE, FUNCTION, FUNCTIONMACRO, INTERFACE, MACRO, EXPORT, SHARED

Support for Parallelism in ECL 
In the HPCC implementation, by default, most ECL constructs will execute in parallel across the hardware being used. Many of the primitives also have a LOCAL option to specify that the operation is to occur locally on each node.

Comparison to Map-Reduce 
The Hadoop Map-Reduce paradigm consists of three phases which correlate to ECL primitives as follows.

References

External links 
 Rosetta Code ECL category
 ECL Language Reference
 Reed Elsevier to acquire ChoicePoint for $3.6 billion
  Reed Elsevier's LexisNexis Buys Seisint for $775 Mln
  Reed Elsevier

Declarative programming languages
Data-centric programming languages
Big data